Cystolepiota amazonica is a species of mushroom-producing fungus in the family Agaricaceae.

Taxonomy 
It was described in 1989 by the German mycologist Rolf Singer who classified it as Cystolepiota amazonica.

Description 
Cystolepiota amazonica is a very small brownish mushroom with white flesh.

Cap: 3mm wide and high and campanulate (bell shaped). The surface is redddish-brown to light chesnut colour. It is not hygrophanous or viscid ad is wrinkled (rugulose) or smooth with subsulcate striations at the margins. Gills: Free or narrowly adnexed, subconfluent. White but drying to pale or dirty brown. Stem: 1.2 cm tall and 0.8mm thick tapering slightly with a thinner apex. The surface is chestnut colour and smooth with white mycelium at the base. No stem ring was observed by Singer. Spores: Globose or subglobose. Dextrinoid, cyanophilic, hyaline, not metachromatic. 2.5-2.8 x 2-2.2μm. Basidia: 11–12.5 x 3.5-4.5 μm. Four spored. Smell: Indistinct.

Habitat and distribution 
The specimens studied by Singer were found growing solitary on fallen, rotting leaves of Dicotyledon plants in the tropical forests of Brazil, 30 km North of Manaus.

References 

Agaricaceae
Fungi described in 1989
Fungi of South America
Taxa named by Rolf Singer